Dylan Lempereur (born 24 October 1998) is a French footballer who plays as a left-back for the Luxembourgish club Differdange.

Professional career
Lempereur first begun his football training with his local club, UL Rombas, before moving to CSO Amnéville at the age of 15. After a couple of successful seasons there, he moved to Troyes AC and signed a three-year contract with them.

He then moved to FC Metz, and made his professional debut with then in a 2–2 (3–2) Coupe de France overtime loss to SM Caen on 7 February 2018. He made his league debut in a 2–2 Ligue 1 tie with En Avant de Guingamp on 24 February 2018. In 2019, Lempereur had a stint with the amateur club Sarre-Union, before joining Differdange in Luxembourg in January 2020.

References

External links
 
 
 FC Metz Profile
 

1998 births
Living people
Footballers from Grand Est
French footballers
Association football defenders
FC Metz players
Ligue 1 players
Championnat National 3 players
Luxembourg National Division players
Sportspeople from Moselle (department)
French expatriate footballers
French expatriate sportspeople in Luxembourg
Expatriate footballers in Luxembourg